Quinton Immelman (born 31 March 1981 in Pretoria, South Africa) is a rugby referee on the Premier Panel of the South African Rugby Union.

In 2016, Immelman was added to the referees' roster for the 2016 Super Rugby season for the first time. Immelman's Super Rugby debut match was between the Sunwolves and Cheetahs, in the Singapore National Stadium, which the Cheetahs narrowly won 32-31. It was also the first ever Super Rugby match to be played in Singapore.
In 2017, he was added to the Pro14 Elite Referees Panel for the 2017–18 Pro14 tournament, he and became the first ever South African referee to officiate in the tournament when he took charge of the Ospreys versus Zebre match in Round One of the competition.

References

Living people
South African rugby union referees
1981 births
People from Pretoria
Super Rugby referees
SARU referees
Currie Cup referees